Based on the key idea of higher-order singular value decomposition (HOSVD) in tensor algebra, Baranyi and Yam proposed the concept of HOSVD-based canonical form of TP functions and quasi-LPV system models. Szeidl et al. proved that the TP model transformation is capable of numerically reconstructing this canonical form.

Related definitions (on TP functions, finite element TP functions, and TP models) can be found here. Details on the control theoretical background (i.e., the TP type polytopic Linear Parameter-Varying state-space model) can be found here.

Existence of the HOSVD-based canonical form

Assume a given finite element TP function:

where . Then, the execution of the HOSVD on the core tensor  leads to:

Then,

that is:

Definition

HOSVD-based canonical form of TP function

 Singular functions of : The weighting functions ,  (termed as the -th singular function on the -th dimension) in vector  form an orthonormal set:

 The subtensors  have the properties of
  is termed core tensor.
 The -mode rank of : The rank in dimension  denoted by  equals the number of non-zero singular values in dimension .

References

Multilinear algebra